The 1992 Gator Bowl was an American college football bowl game that was played on December 31, 1992, at Gator Bowl Stadium in Jacksonville, Florida. The game matched the Florida Gators against the NC State Wolfpack. It was the final contest of the 1992 NCAA Division I-A football season for both teams. It was the first of three Gator Bowls sponsored by Outback Steakhouse; thus, the game was also known as the 1992 Outback Gator Bowl. The game ended in a 27–10 victory for the Gators.

Overview
The game matched the Florida Gators of the Southeastern Conference against the NC State Wolfpack of the Atlantic Coast Conference. The Gators, having lost the 1992 SEC Championship Game to the Alabama Crimson Tide, were co-champions of the Eastern Division of the SEC with the Georgia Bulldogs. The Wolfpack were runners-up in the ACC behind the Florida State Seminoles. The game was the first bowl game featuring the Gators and the Wolfpack, and was their thirteenth meeting. Florida led the series  heading into the game.

Game summary

Scoring summary

Source:

Statistics

References

Gator Bowl
Gator Bowl
Florida Gators football bowl games
NC State Wolfpack football bowl games
Bowl Coalition
December 1992 sports events in the United States
1992 in sports in Florida